Collins House is a residential skyscraper in Collins St Melbourne, Victoria, Australia.

The project has been developed by both the Asian Pacific Group, Golden Age and designed by architectural firm Bates Smart. Launched in 2013, the project received approval by the then-Planning Minister Matthew Guy in February 2014 as part of a "Super Tuesday", whereby five skyscrapers had been approved. The development comprises approximately 300 residential apartments across 61 levels, and will reach a height of  — thus becoming one of the tallest buildings in Melbourne. 

Construction on Collins House commenced in February 2016, and it was completed in 2019.

See also

 List of tallest buildings in Melbourne

References

External links
 

Skyscrapers in Melbourne
Residential skyscrapers in Australia
Apartment buildings in Melbourne
Collins Street, Melbourne
Buildings and structures in Melbourne City Centre
Residential buildings completed in 2018
2018 establishments in Australia